Leptomantispa is a genus of mantidflies in the family Mantispidae. There are about seven described species in Leptomantispa.

Species
These seven species belong to the genus Leptomantispa:
 Leptomantispa ariasi (Penny, 1983)
 Leptomantispa axillaris (Navás, 1908)
 Leptomantispa catarinae Pires Machado & Rafael, 2007
 Leptomantispa chaos Hoffman in Penny, 2002
 Leptomantispa hoffmani Ardila-Camacho in Ardila-Camacho & García, 2015
 Leptomantispa nymphe Hoffman in Penny, 2002
 Leptomantispa pulchella (Banks, 1912)

References

Further reading

 
 
 
 

Hemerobiiformia
Articles created by Qbugbot